Josiah Haynes Armstrong (May 30, 1842 - March 23, 1898) was a Bishop in the African Methodist Episcopal (A.M.E.) Church and a state legislator in Florida. He served several terms in the Florida House of Representatives during the Reconstruction era. The Florida Archives have a photograph of him. According to his Findagrave entry and the photos of hia gravestone posted to it he served in a "Colored" unit during the American Civil War.

He was born in Lancaster, Pennsylvania.

See also
African-American officeholders during and following the Reconstruction era

References

External links
Findagrave entry

1842 births
1898 deaths
Members of the Florida House of Representatives